Helen Lackaye (January 10, 1883 – October 19, 1940) was an American actress.

Life and career 
Lackaye was born on January 10, 1883, in Washington, D.C. She was the sister of actors Wilton Lackaye and James Lackaye and attended school at Holy Cross Convent in Washington, D. C.

Lackaye debuted on stage in New York City in Ninety and Nine at the Academy of Music, after which she performed with Amelia Bingham's repertory company. She debuted on Broadway portraying Hippolyta in A Midsummer Night's Dream (1903).

She was married to Harry J. Ridings, who managed the Cohan Grand Opera House in Chicago.

Lackaye died on October 19, 1940, on a Baltimore and Ohio train travelling through Pennsylvania to the Jersey City Terminal in Jersey City, New Jersey.

At the time of her death, Lackaye had been living in New York for twelve years and had effectively retired from acting. The previous year she had taught dramatics in Cincinnati, Ohio.

Filmography

In theatre 
 She Walked in Her Sleep (1918)
 Crooked Gamblers (1920) as  Mrs. Robertson
 As Ye Mould (1921) as Mrs. J. Lomax Graham
 Captain Applejack (1921) as Mrs. Pengard 
 Izzy (1924) as Mary Byrd
 90 Horse Power (1926) as Mrs. Charles Loring
 Gentle Grafters (1926) as Kitty Doyle
 Revolt (1928) as Mrs. Emily Pasteel

In film 
 The Knife (1918) as Louise Meredith

References

External links

1883 births
1940 deaths
19th-century American actresses
20th-century American actresses
American stage actresses
American film actresses
American silent film actresses
Actresses from Washington, D.C.
Broadway theatre people